Veddasca was a comune (municipality) in the Province of Varese in the Italian region Lombardy, located about  northwest of Milan and about  north of Varese in the Val Veddasca, on the border with Switzerland. 
In 2014 it merges with Maccagno and Pino sulla Sponda del Lago Maggiore in the new municipality of Maccagno con Pino e Veddasca

References

Cities and towns in Lombardy